Olmué Airport,  is an airport serving Olmué, a city in the Valparaíso Region of Chile.

There is nearby mountainous terrain northwest through east, and more distant mountainous terrain in other quadrants.

See also

Transport in Chile
List of airports in Chile

References

External links
OpenStreetMap - Olmué
OurAirports - Olmué
FallingRain - Olmué Airport

Airports in Chile
Airports in Valparaíso Region